Kodangallu is a small locality in Moodabidri in the state of Karnataka, southwest India.  It is located about 2 km from Moodbidri  en route Dharmasthala It is situated  about 37 km  from Mangalore city via NH169.The Jain tombs and Nyaya basadi at Kodangallu are of great historical interest.

Name
Kodangallu's name came because of a big stone lying there.

Schools
Sri Mahaveera College,situated at Kodangallu was founded by Academy of General Education, Manipal and Sri Mahaveera College Trust 1965.

References 

Villages in Dakshina Kannada district